Lutibacter profundi is a Gram-negative, rod-shaped and non-motile bacterium from the genus of Lutibacter which has been isolated from the Loki's Castle hydrothermal system from the Arctic Mid-Ocean Ridge.

References

Flavobacteria
Bacteria described in 2016